Probolinggo is a city on the north coast of East Java province, Indonesia. It covers an area of 56.67 sq. km, and had a population of 217,062 at the 2010 census and 239,649 at the 2020 census; the official estimate as at mid 2021 was 241,202.  It is surrounded on the landward side by Probolinggo Regency of which it was formerly the capital, but it is now not part of the regency.

Like most of northern East Java, the city has a large Madurese population in addition to many ethnically Javanese people. It is located on one of the major highways across Java, and has a harbor that is heavily used by fishing vessels.

Under the Dutch East Indies colonial administration, especially in the 19th century, Probolinggo was a lucrative regional center for refining and exporting sugar, and sugar remains an important product of the area.

The city is famous for its mangoes, locally called mangga manalagi. Strong dry-season winds from July to September, the angin gending, help the mango trees pollinate and are sometimes credited with being the source of the area's quality fruit. The city formerly produced grapes as well, but few grapes are grown in the area now.

The motto of the city is Bestari which is an abbreviation of bersih (cleanliness), sehat (healthy), tertib (orderly), aman (safe), rapi (neat), and indah (beautiful).

Name 
In Negarakertagama, the city was called Banger which means bad odor in Javanese. In 1770, Regent Joyonagoro changed the city's name to Probolinggo. The name derives from praba (light) and lingga ([symbol of] masculinity). Another version of the etymology is that the name derives from prabu (king) and linggih (stop by).

History

Colonial era 
As a result of Mataram's involvement in Geger Pacinan (and subsequent war), Dutch East India Company signed an agreement with Sunan Pakubuwono II on 11 November 1743 to hand over most of eastern Java, including Probolinggo, to the former.

In 1811, under Dutch East Indies' Governor General Daendels rule, Probolinggo was sold to a Chinese man Han Tik-Ko. The agreed price was 1 million ringgit paid in installment for 10 years. He then was given titles of "Mayor Cina" (Chinese mayor) and "Tuan Tanah Probolinggo" ("Probolinggo Lanlord") that had similar authority as bupati (regent). Meanwhile, Probolinggo resident called him  "Babah Tumenggung".

Under Han Tik-Ko, Probolinggo residents were not satisfied of Han Tik-Ko since he imposed heavy tax to them. As a result, on 18 May 1813, a clash happened between the rebellious residents and Han Tik-Ko people. The event was called Perang Kedopok/Kepruk Cino (Kedopok War/Hit the Chinese) in which Han Tik-Ko was killed. The Dutch East Indies Lieutenant Governor Stamford Raffles then bought back the city from Han Tik-Ko's family.

The ruler of Probolinggo between 1818 and 1821 was Raden Tumenggung Aryo Notoadiningrat, while in 1823 the ruler was Raden Tumenggung Panji Notonegoro.

Early independence 
After Japanese surrendered to Allied forces, there was repatriation of Japanese soldiers by Allied force. In Probolinggo, on 29 April 1946 around 1,200 prisoners of war were returned by two ships "Bansiu Maru 3" and "Mashi Maru 6" departed from Probolinggo port.

Indonesia National Revolution 
On 12 April 1947 23:30 3 km from shore near Probolinggo port, a Dutch ship seized and searched a wooden ship called "Boeroehan" and found nothing. In the next day on 11:00 the latter ship was released and 5 minutes later the Dutch ship sailed away and disappeared to northwest. On 13 April 08:45, another Dutch ship went back and forth 5 km from the shore and went to east.

On 23 May 1947, there were 3 Dutch ships spying for Probolinggo. On 06:15, one of the ship searched and seized "Merdeka" ship departing for Tangklok, Sampang, on which then Madura resident boarded it. The latter ship was later released on 07:45. Another ship named "Kembangsari" and several other fishing boats were also either searched for or chased away.

Dewan Pertahanan Daerah Probolinggo (Probolinggo Regional Defense Council) then strengthened the naval defense of the area to face more Dutch ships attacking via sea. As a result, the Dutch later entered the city via land.

Government 
Administration of Probolinggo city (kota) and regency (kabupaten) had repeatedly been separated and merged. There were separation of government of Probolinggo city (kotapraja) and regency based on Ordonantie dated 20 June 1918. But, according on Ordonantie 9 August 1928, the city was abolished and the area was merged again to the regency.

Under Japanese occupation, the administrations were once again separated. The city (under Japanese rule, the level was called shi) mayor (shico) was Gapar Wiryosudibyo, a middle school teacher, while the regency (ken) regent was Nyais Wiryosubroto. Both Probolinggo (shi and ken) were under an administration of Malang-shu (residency).

During National Revolution, on 13 August 1948 the city was abolished again and was absorbed into the regency. Then since the Dutch recognition of Indonesian independence, the city and regency were separated again.

Administrative districts 
Probolinggo city consists of five districts (kecamatan), tabulated below with their areas and population totals from the 2010 census and the 2020 census, together with the official estimates as at mid 2021.  The table also includes the number of administrative villages (rural desa and urban kelurahan) in each district and its postal codes.

Transportation 
Probolinggo once had a tram system spanning across the city. The service was built in 1894 and was operated by Probolinggo Stoomtram Maatschappij.

Probolinggo is a hub city where its main road connect three major city in East java, Surabaya to the west (through Pasuruan and Sidoarjo), Jember to the south through Lumajang, and Banyuwangi to the east through Situbondo. Public buses to many major cities are available in Banyuangga bus terminal.

Since 2019, the Trans-java toll road has been completed and provide faster route to the capital Jakarta, which cuts down travel time significantly to only 9 to 10 hour drive from previously 16 to 20 hours.

Bus 
The city (and the regency) is served by Bayuangga bus station that covers routes to Surabaya, Malang, and Jember.

Railway 
The city is served by Probolinggo railway station that covers most routes to major cities in Java. However, there are no direct train to the capital Jakarta, so travelers to Jakarta have to transit via either Surabaya or Yogyakarta.

Air 
There is no air route to the city. The closest airport is the Juanda International Airport in Surabaya, which is a less than 2 hour drive through newly completed toll road.

Climate
Probolinggo has a tropical savanna climate (Aw) with heavy rainfall December to March and moderate to little rainfall from April to November.

Demography 
In a 1845 census, there were 18,458 Javanese and 56,317 Madurese in Probolinggo. In a more complete census in 1930, in Probolinggo there were 85,257 bumiputera (mostly Madurese and Javanese), 3,179 Chinese, 483 other Far eastern ethnics, and 952 Europeans.

References

External links

Probolinggo NGO

Bibliography 
 

 
Populated places in East Java